This list of geographers is presented in English alphabetical transliteration order (by surnames).

A

Hardo Aasmäe (Estonia, 1951–2014)
Aziz Ab'Saber (Brazil, 1924–2012)
Diogo Abreu (Portugal, born 1947)
John Adams, (England, pre–1670–1738)
Peter Adams (Canada, born 1936)–
Agatharchides (Ancient Greece, 2nd c. BCE)
Agathedaemon of Alexandria (Ancient Greece, 2nd c. CE)
John A. Agnew (England/US, born 1949)
Irasema Alcántara-Ayala (Mexico, born 1970)
T. Alford-Smith (US/England, 1864–1936)
Richard Andree (Germany, 1835–1912)
A. W. Andrews (England, 1868–1959)
Ash Amin (England, born 1955)
Alypius of Antioch (Roman Empire, fl. c. 450)
Jacques Ancel (France, 1879–1943)
Karl Andree (Germany, 1808–1875)
Richard Andree (Germany, 1835–1912)
Pilar Benejam Arguimbau (Spain, born 1937)
Aaron Arrowsmith (England, 1750–1823)
Väinö Auer (Finland, 1895–1981)
Félix de Azara (Spain, 1742–1821)

B

Zonia Baber (US, 1862–1956)
Karl Ernst von Baer (Russia, 1792–1876)
Robert Bailey (US, born 1939)
Thomas Bailey (England, 1785–1856)
Oliver Edwin Baker (US, 1883–1949)
Abu Abdullah al-Bakri (Al-Andalus, 1014–1094)
Adriano Balbi (Italy, 1782–1848)
Ahmed ibn Sahl al-Balkhi (Persia, 850–934)
Robert Balling (US, born 1952)
Alexandre Barbié du Bocage (France, 1798-1835)
John Barrow (England, fl. 1735–1774)
Mark Bassin (US, living)
Keith Barber (England, 1944–2017)
John George Bartholomew (Scotland, 1860–1920)
Ibn Battuta (Morocco, 1304–1369)
Oscar Baumann (Austria, 1864–1899)
Jacqueline Beaujeu-Garnier (France, 1917–1995)
Anthony Bebbington (US, born 1962)
Battista Beccario (Italy, 15th c.)
Bertha Becker (Brazil, 1930–2013)
Frederick William Beechey (England, 1796–1856)
Walter Behrmann (Germany, 1882–1955)
Charles Tilstone Beke (England, 1800–1874)
Elena Berezovich (Russia, born 1966)
Lev Semenovich Berg (Russia/Soviet Union, 1876–1950)
Heinrich Berghaus (Germany, 1797–1884)
Luiza Bialasiewicz (Poland/Netherlands, born 1971)
Abū Rayhān Bīrūnī (Persia, 973–1048)
Joan Blaeu (Netherlands, 1596–1673)
Harm de Blij (US, 1935–2014)
Franz Boas (Germany/US, 1858–1942
Roland Bonaparte (France, 1858–1924)
John Bowack (England, fl. 1737)
E. G. Bowen (Wales, 1900–1983)
Isaiah Bowman (Canada/US, 1878–1950)
Edward William Brayley (England, 1801–1870)
Harold Brookfield (England/Australia, born 1926)
John Brown (England, 1797–1861)
Conrad Malte-Brun (Denmark/France, 1775–1826)
Sylvie Brunel (France, born 1960)
Jean Brunhes (France, 1869–1930)
Harriet Bulkeley (England, born 1972)
William Bunge (US/Canada, 1928–2013)
Cristoforo Buondelmonti (Italy, 1386 – c. 1430) 
Philip Burden (US, living)
Richard Francis Burton (England, 1821–1890)
Anne Buttimer (Ireland, 1938–2017)

C

Rafael Torres Campos (Spain, 1853–1904)
Giovanni da Carignano (Italy, c. 1250–1329)
Ana Fani Alessandri Carlos (Brazil, living)
Nathanael Carpenter (England, 1589 – c. 1628)
Manuel Castells (Spain, born 1942)
Emanuela Casti (Italy, born 1950)
Richard Cathcart (US, born 1943)
Nicolay de Caveri (Italy, fl. 15th–16th cc.)
Andreas Cellarius (Germany/Netherlands, c. 1596–1665)
Samuel de Champlain (France/Canada, 1567–1635)
Sylvia Chant (England, 1960–2019)
Chen Cheng-Siang Chen (China, 1922–2003)
Elena Chiozza (Argentina, 1919–2011)
George Chisholm (Scotland, 1850–1930)
Richard Chorley (England, 1927–2002)
Walter Christaller (Germany, 1893–1969)
Georgius Chrysococcas (Greece/Persia, fl. 1340s)
Václav Cílek (Czech Republic, born 1955)
Claudius Clavus (Claudus Claussøn Swart, Denmark, born 1388)
Philipp Clüver (Poland/Netherlands, 1580–1622)
Denis Cosgrove (England, 1948–2008)
John Antony Cramer (England, 1793–1848)
Abraham Cresques (Spain, 1325–1387)
George Cressey (US, 1896–1963)
James Croll (Scotland, 1821–1890)
Mike Crang (England, living)
Vital Cuinet (France/Turkey, 1833–1896)
Janel Curry (US, living)
Sarah Curtis (England, living)
Susan Cutter (US, born 1950)
Jovan Cvijić (Serbia, 1865–1927)

D

Patricia Daley (Jamaica, living)
Alexander Dalrymple (Scotland, 1737–1808)
Jack Dangermond (US, born 1945)
Amanda Davies (Australia, living)
William Morris Davis (US, 1850–1934)
Frank Debenham (Australia/England, 1883–1965)
John Dee (England, 1527–1608)
Ruth DeFries (US, born 1957)
Paul Vidal de la Blache (France, 1845–1918)
Félix Delamarche (France, fl. 18th–19th cc.)
Michael N. DeMers (US, born 1951)
Jared Diamond (US, born 1937)
Dicaearchus (Greece, c. 350–28 BCE)
Peter Dicken (England, born 1938)
Frans Dieleman (Netherlands, 1942–2005)
Al-Dimashqi (Syria, 1256–1327)
Abu Hanifa Dinawari (Iran, 828–896)
Vasily V. Dokuchaev (Russian Empire, 1846–1903)
William E. Doolittle (US, born 1947)
Mona Domosh (US, born 1957)
Veronica Della Dora (Italy, born 1976)
Angelino Dulcert (Italy/Spain, 14th c.)
John Dunkin (England, 1782–1846)
G. H. Dury (England, 1916–1996)

E

William Gordon East (England, 1902–1998)
Sally Eden (England, 1967–2016)
Eratosthenes (Greece, 276–194 BCE)
Lewis Evans (Wales/British American colonies, c. 1700–1756)
George Everest (England, 1790–1866)

F

Ahmad ibn Fadlan (Iraq, 10th c.)
Eileen Fairbairn (New Zealand, 1893–1981)
Ghazi Falah (Canada, living)
Abraham Farissol (Italy, c. 1451–1525 or 1526)
Ibn al-Faqih (Persia, 10th c.)
Filippo Ferrari (Italy, 1551–1626)
Carlos Ferrás Sexto (Iran, fl. 902)
Abu'l-Fida (Abulfeda) (Syria, 1273–1331)
Louise Filion (Canada, born 1945)
Ruth Fincher (Australia, born 1951)
Alexander George Findlay (England, 1812–1875)
Irene Fischer (Austria, US, 1907–2009)
Regina Fleszarowa (Poland, 1888–1969)
Georges Fournier (France, 1595–1652)
Janet Franklin (US, born 1959)
J. Keith Fraser (Canada, born 1922)
Gemma Frisius (Netherlands, 1508–1555)
Lynne Frostick (England, born 1949)
Masahisa Fujita (Japan, born 1943)

G

Alfons Gabriel (Austria, 1894–1976)
Fay Gale (Australia, 1932–2008)
Johann Georg August Galletti (Germany, 1750–1828)
Paul Gallez (Argentina, 1920–2007)
Francis Galton (England, 1822–1911)
Henry Gannett (US, 1846–1914)
Abu Sa'id Gardezi (Iran, died 1061)
Rita Gardner (England, born 1955)
Alice Garnett (England, 1903–1989)
William Garrison (US, 1924–2015)
Artur Gavazzi (Croatia/Slovenia, 1861–1944)
Johann Gottlieb Georgi (Germany, 1729–1802)
Nicolaus Germanus (Germany, c. 1420 – c. 1490)
Gerald of Wales (Wales, fl. 1310–1330)
Ruth Wilson Gilmore (US, born 1950)
Gim Jeong-ho (Korea, 1804 – c. 1866)
Giuseppe Maria Giulietti (Italy, 1847–1881)
John Alan Glennon (US, born 1970)
John of Głogów (Poland, c. 1445–1507)
Johann Georg Gmelin (Germany, 1709–1755)
Johann Friedrich Goldbeck (Germany, 1748–1812)
Reginald G. Golledge (Australia/US, 1937–2009)
Michael Frank Goodchild (Canada/US, born 1944)
Jean Gottman (France, 1915–1994)
Peter Gould (US, 1932–2000)
Derek Gregory (England/Canada, born 1951)
Jean Grove (England, 1927–2001)
Gu Yanwu (China, 1613–1682)
Lev Gumilev (Russia/Soviet Union, 1912–1992)
Arnold Henry Guyot (Switzerland/US, 1807–1884)

H

Mohammad Reza Hafeznia (Iran, born 1955)
Toni Hagen (Switzerland, 1917–2003)
Torsten Hägerstrand (Sweden, 1916–2004)
Peter Haggett (England, born 1933)
Yaqut al-Hamawi (Near East, 1179–1229)
Hamdani (Near East, 893–945)
Susan Hanson (US, born 1943)
John Brian Harley (England, 1932–1991)
Cole Harris (Canada, born 1936)
Richard Hartshorne (US, 1899–1992)
David Harvey (US/Britain, born 1935)
Margaret Hasluck (Scotland, 1885–1948)
Henri Hauser (France, 1866–1946)
Karl Haushofer (Germany, 1869–1946)
Harriet Hawkins (England, born 1980)
Ibn Hawqal (Near East, died after 977)
Ibn al-Haytham (Alhazen) (Iraq, 965–1039)
Zheng He (China, 1371–1433 or 1435)
Lesley Head (Australia, living)
John Heap (England, 1932–2006)
Sven Hedin (Sweden, 1865–1952)
Gamal Hemdan (Egypt, 1928–1993)
Andrew John Herbertson (Scotland, 1865–1915)
Robert Heron (Scotland, 1764–1807)
Alfred Hettner (Germany, 1859–1941)
Hipparchus (Greece, 190–120 BCE)
Filip Hjulström (Sweden, 1092–1982)
Jacoba Hol (Netherlands, 1886–1964)
Thomas Holdich (England, 1843–1929)
John Holmes (Australia, living)
Johann Homann (Germany, 1664–1724)
Sally P. Horn (US, living)
J. F. Horrabin (England, 1886–1942)
Robert E. Horton (US, 1875–1945)
Carl Humann (Germany, 1839–1896)
Alexander von Humboldt (Germany, 1769–1859)
Ellsworth Huntington (US, 1876–1947)
Thomas Hutchins (US, 1730–1789)

I

Muhammad al-Idrisi (Dreses) (Islamic Spain, 1100–1166)
Cosmas Indicopleustes (Greece, 6th c. CE)
Anastas Ishirkov (Bulgaria, 1868–1937)

J

Jane Jacobs (US/Canada, 1916–2006)
Jane M. Jacobs (Australia, born 1958)
Thomas Jefferys (England, c. 1719–1771)
Alexander Keith Johnston (Scotland, 1804–1871)
Alexander Keith Johnston (Scotland, 1844–1879)
Ron J. Johnston (England, 1941–2020)
Gareth Jones (England, living)
Kelvyn Jones (Wales/England, born 1953)
Reece Jones (US, born 1976)
Ibn Jubayr (Taifa of Valencia/Arabia, 1145–1217)

K

Felix Philipp Kanitz (Austria-Hungary, 1829–1904)
Mahmud al-Kashgari (Kara-Khanid Khanate, 1005–1102)
Robert Kates (US, 1929–2018)
Cindi Katz (US, born 1954)
Ibn Khordadbeh (Persia, c. 820–912)
Muhammad ibn Mūsā al-Khwārizmī (Persia, 780–850)
Heinrich Kiepert (Germany, 1818–1899)
Richard Kiepert (Germany, 1846–1915)
Al-Kindi (Alkindus, Abbasid Caliphate, 801–873)
Cuchlaine King (England, 1922–2019)
Caroline King-Okumu (Kenya, living)
Fred B. Kniffen (US, 1900–1993)
Peter Knight (England, born 1947)
Anne Kelly Knowles (US, born 1957)
Janelle Knox-Hayes (US, living)
Audrey Kobayashi (Canada, born 1951)
Grigorios Konstantas (Greece, 1753–1844)
Peter Kosler (Carniola, 1824–1879)
Blasius Kozenn (Carniola, 1821–1871)
Stepan Krasheninnikov (Russia, 1711–1755)
Peter Kropotkin (Russia, 1842–1921)

L

Yves Lacoste (France, born 1929)
Joannes de Laet (Netherlands, 1581–1649) in Dutch and Latin
William Lambton (England, c. 1753–1823)
Marcia Langton (Australia, born 1951)
Wendy Larner (New Zealand, living)
Vanessa Lawrence (England, born 1962)
Giovanni Leardo (Italy, 15th c.)
Philippe Le Billon (Canada, living)
Jean Le Clerc (France, c. 1560–1621/1624)
Peirce F. Lewis (US, 1927–2018)
Elisabeth Lichtenberger (Austria, 1925–2017)
Diana Liverman (England, born 1954)
Liu An (China, 177–122 BCE)
David Livingstone (Scotland/East Africa, 1813–1873)
Fyodor Luzhin (Russia, died 1727)

M

Halford John Mackinder (UK, 1861–1947)
Ibn Sa'id al-Maghribi (Arabia, 1213–1286)
Ahmad ibn Mājid (Arabia, born 1432)
Conrad Malte-Brun (Denmark/France, 1775–1826)
Victor Adolphe Malte-Brun (France, 1816–1889)
Luigi Ferdinando Marsili (Italy, 1658–1730)
Kenneth Mason (England, 1887–1976)
Doreen Massey (England, 1944–2016)
Abu al-Hasan (Arabia, 896-956)
Otto Maull (Austria/Germany, 1887–1957)
Linda McDowell (England, born 1949)
Katherine McKittrick (Canada, living)
Megasthenes (Greece, c. 350 – c. 290 BCE)
Simion Mehedinți (Romania, 1868–1962)
D. W. Meinig (US, born 1928)
August Meitzen (Germany 1822–1910)
Anton Melik (Slovenia, 1890–1966)
Josefina Gómez Mendoza (Spain, born 1942)
Daniel Gottlieb Messerschmidt (Germany/Russia, 1685–1735)
Alfred Merz (US, born 1924)
Nick Middleton (England, born 1960)
Don Mitchell (US, born 1961)
Henry Mitchell (US, 1830–1902)
Katharyne Mitchell (US, born 1961)
Aleksandra Monedzhikova, (Bulgaria, 1889–1959)
Janice Monk (Australia, born 1937)
Mark Monmonier (US, born 1943)
Elina González Acha de Correa Morales (Spain, 1861–1942)
Jedidiah Morse (US, 1761–1826)
Michael Mortimore (England, 1937–2017)
William G. Moseley (US, born 1965)
Al-Muqaddasi (Jerusalem/Fatimid Caliphate, c. 945–1000)
Hamdallah Mustawfi (Persia, 1281–1349)

N

Richa Nagar (India, born 1968)
Catherine Nash (England, living)
Christophe Neff (Germany/France, born 1964)
Marion Newbigin (Scotland, 1869–1934)
Linda Newson (England, living)
Joseph Nicollet (France, 1786–1843)
Ng Cho-nam (Hong Kong, 1960–2019)
Ljubinka Nikolić (Yugoslavia/Serbia, born 1964)
Pedro Nunes (Portugal, 1502–1578)

O

Erich Obst (Germany, 1886–1981)
Vladimir Obruchev (Russia/Soviet Union, 1863–1956)
Patrick O'Flanagan (Ireland, born 1947)
Miles Ogborn (England, living)
Kenneth Olwig (US, born 1946)
Gearóid Ó Tuathail (Ireland, born 1962)
Ibn Al Ouardy (Arabia, died 1330)
Susan Owens (England, born 1954)

P

Diego de Pantoja (Spain/Macau, 1571–1618)
Xoán Paredes (Spain/Ireland, born 1975)
Joseph Partsch (Germany, 1851–1925)
Martin J. Pasqualetti (US, living)
Patrick Geddes (Scotland, 1854–1932)
Pausanias (Greece, fl. c. 150)
Ceri Peach (Wales, 1939–2018)
Albrecht Penck (Germany, 1858–1945)
Walther Penck (Germany, 1888–1923)
Jocelyne Pérard (France, born 1940)
Nikolai Petrusevich (Russia, 1838–1880)
Daniel Philippidis (Greece, c. 1750–1832) 
Chris Philo (England/Scotland, born 1960)
Domenico and Francesco Pizzigano (Italy, 14th c.)
Marco Polo (Italy, 1254–1324)
Posidonius (Greece, 135–51 BCE)
Alice Poulleau (France, 1885–1960)
Allan Pred (US, 1936–2007)
John Robert Victor Prescott (England/Australia, 1931–2018)
Nikolai Przhevalsky (Russia, 1839–1888)
Pseudo-Scymnus (Greece, c. 100 BCE)
Ptolemy (Roman Egypt, c. 85–165)
Denise Pumain (France, born 1946)
Pytheas (Greece, fl. c. 360 BCE)

Q

Qudama ibn Ja'far (Syria, c. 873 – c. 932/948)

R

Sarah A. Radcliffe (England, living)
Friedrich Ratzel (Germany, 1844–1904)
Amin Razi (Persia, 16th century)
Élisée Reclus (France, 1830–1905)
Judith Rees (England, born 1944)
Piri Reis (Turkey, 1465–1554)
James Rennell (England, 1742–1830)
Ebenezer Rhodes (England, 1762–1839)
Orlando Ribeiro (Portugal, 1911–1997)
Ferdinand Baron Von Richthofen (19th century)
Tristram Risdon (England, c. 1580–1640)
Carl Ritter (Germany, 1779–1859)
Arthur H. Robinson (US, 1915–2004)
Edward Robinson (US, 1894–1963)
Jean Baptiste Gaspard Roux de Rochelle (France, 1762–1849)
Joseph Rock (Austria/US, 1884–1962)
Friedrich Gerhard Rohlfs (Germany, 1831–1896)
Bernard Romans (Netherlands, 1741–1784)
Albrecht Roscher (Germany, 1836–1860)
Gillian Rose (England, born 1962)
Thomas E. Ross (US, born 1942)
William Roy (Scotland, 1726–1790)
Ibn Rushd (Averroes, 1126–1198)
Ibn Rustah (Persia, died 903 CE)

S

David Sadler (England, born 1960)
Louis Vivien de Saint-Martin (France, 1802–1896)
Luis García Sáinz (Spain, 1894–1965)
Milton Santos (Brazil, 1926–2001)
Saskia Sassen (US, born 1947)
Carl Sauer (US, 1889–1975)
Fred K. Schaefer (Germany/US, 1904–1953)
Henry Schoolcraft (US, 1793–1864)
Leopold von Schrenck (Russia, 1826–1894)
Peter Carl Ludwig Schwarz (Germany/Russia, 1822–1894)
Allen J. Scott (US, born 1938)
Scymnus of Chios (Greece, fl. c. 185 BCE)
Pyotr Semenov-Tyan-Shansky (Russia, 1827–1914)
Ellen Churchill Semple (US, 1863–1932)
Karen Seto (US, living)
Edward Shackleton, Baron Shackleton (England, 1911–1994)
Shen Kuo (沈括, China, 1031–1095)
Yuly Shokalsky (Russia/Soviet Union, 1856–1940)
Ibn Sina (Persia, 980–1037)
Paul Allen Siple (US, 1908–1968)
Andrew Sluyter (US, born 1958)
George Smith (Scotland, 1833–1919)
Neil Smith (Scotland/US, 1954–2012) 
Richard G. Smith (England/Wales, living)
Susan J. Smith (England, born 1956)
Edward Soja (US, 1940–2015)
Pavle Solarić (Slavonia, 1779–1821)
Guillem Soler (Spain, fl. 1380s)
Su Song (蘇頌, China, 1020–1101)
Nikolai Spathari (Moldavia/Russia, 1636–1708)
Oskar Spate (England/Australia, 1911–2000)
John Hanning Speke (England, 1827–1864)
Alison Stenning (England, living)
Evelyn Stokes (New Zealand, 1936–2005)
Strabo (Roman Empire, Greece, c. 63/64 – c. 24 BCE)

T

Andres Tarand (Estonia, born 1940)
Ralph Stockman Tarr (US, 1864–1912)
Eva Germaine Rimington Taylor (England, 1879–1966)
Peter J. Taylor (England, born 1944)
Nigel Thrift (England, born 1949)
Johann Heinrich von Thünen (Germany, 1783–1850)
Joy Tivy (Ireland/Scotland, 1924–1995)
Waldo R. Tobler (US, 1930–2018)
Wilhelm Tomaschek (Austrian Empire, 1841–1901)
Roger Tomlinson (England, 1933–2014)
George Trebeck (England/India, 1800–1825)
Emil Trinkler (Germany, 1896–1931)
Carl Troll (Germany, 1899–1975)
Yi-Fu Tuan (段義孚, US/China, born 1930)
Billie Lee Turner II (US, born 1945)
Marinos of Tyre (Greece, c. 70–130 CE)

U

Edward Ullman (US, 1912–1976)

V

Vakhushti of Kartli (Georgia, 1696–1757)
Gill Valentine (England, living)
Anastasia van Burkalow (American, 1911–2004)
Didier Robert de Vaugondy (France, 1723–1786)
Pietro Vesconte (Italy, fl. 1310–1330)
José Antonio Villaseñor y Sánchez (Mexico, fl. 1740s)
Albertinus de Virga (Italy, 15th c.)

W

Alfred Russel Wallace (England, 1823–1913)
Ibn al-Wardi (Arabia, 1291/1292–1348/1349)
Michael Watts (England, born 1951)
Bradford Washburn (US, 1910–2007)
Alfred Weber (Germany, 1868–1958)
Alfred Lothar Wegener (Germany, 1911–2006)
Johannes Werner (Germany, 1468–1522)
Sarah Whatmore (England, born 1959)
Gilbert F. White (US, 1911–2006)
Emma Willard (US, 1787–1870)
John Francon Williams FRGS (Wales, 1854–1911)
Alan Wilson (England, born 1939)
Charles W. J. Withers (Scotland, born 1954)
Jennifer Wolch (US, living)
Denis Wood (US, born 1945)
David Woodward (US, 1942–2004) 
Fanny Bullock Workman (US, 1859–1925))
Dawn Wright (US, born 1961)
John Kirtland Wright (US, 1891–1969)

X

Xu Xiake (徐霞客, China, 1587–1641)

Y

Naomasa Yamasaki (山崎 直方, Japan, 1870–1929)
Ya'qubi (Abbasid Caliphate, died 897)

Z

Wilbur Zelinsky (US, born 1921)
Jacob Ziegler (Germany, 1470/1471–1549)
Eberhard August Wilhelm von Zimmermann (Germany, 1743–1815)
Karl Bernhard Zoeppritz (Germany, 1881–1908)

See also
List of cartographers
List of Graeco-Roman geographers
List of Muslim geographers
Russian geographers

Geographers